The Locus 7 Site is an archaeological site in Washington Township, Fayette County, Pennsylvania, United States. It is believed to be the location of a former Monongahela village, but its date is uncertain; the village may have existed at any time between 900 and 1600. Its location on a bluff is unusual for Monongahela village sites, but this may have contributed to its preservation; most riverside Monongahela sites in the valley of the Monongahela River have been destroyed by development.

Small-scale archaeological investigation at the site has revealed a wide range of pottery at the site, along with a significant amount of mussel shells; it is believed that a more extensive excavation would yield evidence of small round houses and a stockade.  Such a large amount of potential findings has been theorized because of the limited disturbance that the site has seen: unlike most Monongahela sites in the region, it has been damaged only by surface cultivation by local farmers who used only horse-powered equipment.

Locus 7's archaeological significance was recognized in 1980 when it was listed on the National Register of Historic Places.

See also
List of Native American archaeological sites on the National Register of Historic Places in Pennsylvania

Notes

40°6′24″N 79°50′13″W

References

Further reading
Michael, Ronald L.  Archaeological and Historical Study of Legislative Route 1070, Sections B10-B90.  N.p.: Pennsylvania Department of Transportation, 1977. 

Archaeological sites on the National Register of Historic Places in Pennsylvania
Fayette County, Pennsylvania
Former populated places in Pennsylvania
Monongahela culture
Native American populated places
National Register of Historic Places in Fayette County, Pennsylvania